St. John's Lutheran School (also known as the Johannes Arms Apartments) is a historic Lutheran school building at 315 W. 4th Street in Topeka, Kansas, United States. It was built between 1919 and 1922 and added to the National Register of Historic Places in 1985. Until 1949 it was home to the present-day Topeka Lutheran School.

It was deemed "primarily significant as an exceptionally-intact example of the institutional architecture of Frank C. Squires, a prominent Topeka architect who practiced in the early decades of the twentieth century. Additionally, it is locally significant for its historical contributions to education in Topeka."

References

Defunct schools in Kansas
School buildings on the National Register of Historic Places in Kansas
School buildings completed in 1919
Schools in Shawnee County, Kansas
National Register of Historic Places in Topeka, Kansas
1919 establishments in Kansas